James E. Hooper House is a historic home located at Baltimore, Maryland, United States. It is a large Queen Anne style freestanding masonry structure, situated among the buildings of the Old Goucher College Buildings complex.  It is a rectangular building with a steeply pitched gable roof, a small, two-story wing extending, and a -story bay window extension, with a small gable roof. There are two stories in the main section of the house, and two more stories in the gable.  It is constructed of dark red bricks with terra cotta, brownstone, and granite trim. The exterior features a slate shingle roof, and a square oriel, three bays wide and one bay deep, made of wood, and painted green.  The house was constructed in 1886 for James E. Hooper (1839–1908).

James E. Hooper House was listed on the National Register of Historic Places in 1982. In 2001, the building was purchased by Morphius Development Consortium, who returned the exterior wood trim to its original green color and restored other various interior features, including multiple pocket doors and hand cut decorative wooden wall panels.  The building is currently the headquarters of Morphius Records and Lord Baltimore Recording Studio.

Fire

Late at night on Saturday, September 17th, 2022, a fire erupted from the attic space of the building. The flames burned for nearly an hour before being extinguished by numerous trucks of firefighters. Two residentes of the adjacent 2300 N Calvert St apartment building called the Baltimore City Fire Department before the building's alarms went off, saving the lives of 3 occupants who were inside at the time. While the fire remained isolated to the attic in which it started, subsequent smoke and water severely damaged the remaining interior. Artists spaces were notably affected, with artists having brought their paintings out into the side lot to dry the day after. It is unclear at this time what caused the fire, but the building was producing significant smoke before the flames began to intensify. No injuries were reported.

References

External links
, including photo from 1996, at Maryland Historical Trust

Barclay, Baltimore
Houses on the National Register of Historic Places in Baltimore
Houses in Baltimore
Houses completed in 1886
Queen Anne architecture in Maryland
1886 establishments in Maryland